The Gunzenhausen−Pleinfeld railway (also called the Seenland-Bahn or "Lakeland railway") is a 16.8 km long branch line that runs along the south bank of the Brombach lakes from Gunzenhausen to Pleinfeld. The name Seenlandbahn comes from its location in the Franconian lake district, because the line provides access to the lakes of Großer Brombachsee, Kleiner Brombachsee and Altmühlsee.

History 

The line was opened on 1 December 1849 as part of the Ludwig South-North Railway, after the planned route via Gunzenhausen, Spalt and Georgensgmünd was cancelled due to objections from the hop farmers of Spalt who were concerned about the quality of their products. With the construction of the line from Treuchtlingen to Donauwörth (opened in 1906) the section from Pleinfeld to Gunzenhausen, as well as the entire stretch from Pleinfeld via Nördlingen to Donauwörth, lost its importance and levels of traffic on the line steadily fell.

Operations 
Since 27 September 1992 the line has been integrated in the Nuremberg Regional Transport Network (Verkehrsverbund Großraum Nürnberg) or VGN as line R62. Services are provided today by Class 642 multiples that run every 60 minutes from Monday to Friday and every 2 hours at weekends.

See also
Bavarian branch lines

External links 

Branch lines in Bavaria
Buildings and structures in Weißenburg-Gunzenhausen
Railway lines opened in 1849
1849 establishments in Bavaria